Natalija Eder (born 6 August 1980) is a visually impaired Paralympian athlete from Austria competing mainly in F12 classification throwing events. She competed at the 2012 Summer Paralympics, where she won a bronze medal in the javelin throw, and 2020 Summer Paralympics.

Life 
Eder took up para-sports in 1997 while still living in her home country of Belarus. She moved to Austria in 2003 and represented her new country in the 2012 Summer Paralympics in London. 

Eder has also won medals at IPC World and European Championships.

Notes

External links
 
Natalija Eder of Austria competes in the Women's Shot Put F11/F12 Final 

1980 births
Living people
Belarusian female shot putters
Belarusian female javelin throwers
Paralympic athletes of Belarus
Austrian female shot putters
Austrian female javelin throwers
Paralympic athletes of Austria
Athletes (track and field) at the 2012 Summer Paralympics
Athletes (track and field) at the 2016 Summer Paralympics
Athletes (track and field) at the 2020 Summer Paralympics
Paralympic bronze medalists for Austria
Medalists at the 2012 Summer Paralympics
Medalists at the 2016 Summer Paralympics
Paralympic medalists in athletics (track and field)